The 37th General Assembly of Nova Scotia represented Nova Scotia between 1920 and 1925.

The Liberal Party led by George Henry Murray formed the government. Ernest Howard Armstrong succeeded Murray as premier in 1923.

Robert Irwin served as speaker for the assembly.

The assembly was dissolved on June 2, 1925.

List of Members 

Notes:

References 
 

Terms of the General Assembly of Nova Scotia
1920 establishments in Nova Scotia
1925 disestablishments in Nova Scotia
20th century in Nova Scotia